Jack Williams (born March 27, 1985) is a former American football cornerback. He was drafted by the Denver Broncos in the fourth round of the 2008 NFL Draft. He played college football at Kent State.

He has also played for the Detroit Lions.

External links
Denver Broncos bio
Kent State Golden Flashes bio

1985 births
Living people
Players of American football from Norfolk, Virginia
American football cornerbacks
Kent State Golden Flashes football players
Denver Broncos players
Detroit Lions players
Chicago Rush players
Las Vegas Locomotives players